Algérienne sauce is a sweet and spicy sauce with a yellowish-orange color. It is often served at businesses serving French tacos or kebab, friteries, or other similar fast-food businesses in Algeria, Morocco, Belgium, France, and Switzerland.

History 
A ""  was cited as early as 1879 in a book entitled The Book of Menus.

Description 
Algérienne sauce has traditionally been prepared with mayonnaise ingredients (oil, egg yolk), to which are added mustard, shallot, black pepper, vinegar, and chili pepper or harissa, and sometimes also tomato or tomato sauce, anchovies, capers, etc. Algérienne sauce is associated with French tacos.

See also 
 Samurai sauce
 Sauce andalouse

Notes and references 

Hot sauces
Belgian sauces